Hesioninae are a subfamily of phyllodocid "bristle worms" (class Polychaeta). They are (like almost all polychaetes) marine organisms; most are found on the continental shelf.

They are divided into two tribes, of which at least the Psamathini seem to represent a good clade.

Footnotes

References
  (2008): Hesioninae. Version of 2008-MAR-26. Retrieved 2009-FEB-23.

Phyllodocida